Washington Township is one of twelve townships in Delaware County, Indiana. According to the 2020 census, its population was 1,849 and it contained 889 housing units.

Geography
Jackson Lake is in this township.

Cities and towns
 Gaston

Unincorporated towns
 Janney
 Stockport
 Wheeling

Adjacent townships
 Jefferson Township, Grant County (north)
 Licking Township, Blackford County (northeast)
 Union Township (east)
 Hamilton Township (southeast)
 Harrison Township (south)
 Monroe Township, Madison County (southwest)
 Van Buren Township, Madison County (west)
 Fairmount Township, Grant County (northwest)

Major highways
  Interstate 69

Cemeteries
The township contains five cemeteries: Elizabethtown, Olive Branch, Thompson, Wheeling and Zion Chapel.

Demographics

2020 census
As of the census of 2020, there were 1,849 people, 811 households, and 341 families living in the township. The racial makeup of the township was 95.78% White, 1.6% African American, 1.1% Asian, 3.8% from other races, and 3.35% from two or more races. Hispanic and Latino of any race were 1.9% of the population.

There were 811 households, of which 22.5% had children under 18 living with them, 42.05% were married couples living together, 4.93% had a female householder with no husband present, and 2.59% had a male householder with no wife present, and 50.43% were non-families. The average household size was 2.28 and the average family size was 2.69.

The median age in the township was 45.2. 3.8% of residents were under the age of 5; 22.5% of residents were under the age of 18; 77.5% were age 18 or older; and 17.7% were age 65 or older. 7.0% of the population were veterans.

The most common language spoken at home was English with 98.7% speaking it at home, 0.9% spoke Spanish at home and 0.4% spoke an Asian or Pacific Islander language at home. 0.8% of the population were foreign born.

The median household income in Washington Township was $39,821, 29.1% less than the median average for the state of Indiana. 10.8% of the population were in poverty, including 14.6% of residents under the age of 18. The poverty level for the township was 2.1% lower than that of the state. 22.9% of the population were disabled and 11.6% had no healthcare coverage. 32.2% of the population had attained a high school or equivalent degree, 31.4% had attended college but received no degree, 8.7% had attained an Associate's degree or higher, 6.6% had attained a Bachelor's degree or higher, and 4.7% had a graduate or professional degree. 23.0% had no degree. 60.2% of Washington Township residents were employed, working a mean of 40.3 hours per week.

References
 United States Census Bureau cartographic boundary files
 U.S. Board on Geographic Names

External links

 Indiana Township Association
 United Township Association of Indiana

Townships in Delaware County, Indiana
Townships in Indiana